The Spender may refer to:

 The Spender (1913 film), American silent short romance film directed by Harry Solter

 The Spender (1919 film), American silent comedy film directed by Charles Swickard